The 1931 All-Ireland Senior Hurling Championship was the 45th staging of the All-Ireland hurling championship since its establishment by the Gaelic Athletic Association in 1887. The championship began on 10 May 1931 and ended on 1 November 1931.

Tipperary were the defending champions, however, they were defeated in the provincial series of games. Cork won the title following a 5-8 to 3-4 victory over Kilkenny in a second replay of the final.

Format

Leinster Championship

Quarter-finals: (2 matches) These were two single matches between the first four teams drawn from the province of Leinster. Two teams were eliminated at this stage while the two winning teams advanced to the semi-finals.

Semi-finals: (2 matches) The winners of the two quarter-finals joined the two remaining Leinster teams to make up the semi-final pairings.  Two teams were eliminated at this stage while the two winning teams advanced to the final.

Final: (1 match) The winners of the two semi-finals contested this game.  One team was eliminated at this stage while the winning team advanced to the All-Ireland semi-final.

Munster Championship

Quarter-finals: (2 matches) These were two single matches between the first four teams drawn from the province of Munster. Two teams were eliminated at this stage while the two winning teams advanced to the semi-finals.

Semi-final: (1 match) The winners of the two quarter-finals played in this lone semi-final.  One team was eliminated at this stage while the winning team advanced to the final.

Final: (1 match) The winner of the semi-final and Waterford, who received a bye to this stage of the championship, contested this game.  One team was eliminated at this stage while the winning team advanced to the All-Ireland final.

All-Ireland Championship

Semi-final: (1 match) The winners of the Leinster championship were drawn to play Galway, who received a bye to this stage of the championship.  One team was eliminated at this stage while the winning team advanced to the final.

Final: (1 match) The winners of the lone semi-final and the Munster champions contested this game with the winners being declared All-Ireland champions.

Results

Leinster Senior Hurling Championship

Munster Senior Hurling Championship

All-Ireland Senior Hurling Championship

Semi-finals

Final

Championship statistics

Scoring

Widest winning margin: 28 points 
Kilkenny 8-8 : Wexford 1-1 (Leinster quarter-final, 31 May 1931)
Most goals in a match: 10 
Kilkenny 7-2 : Galway 3-1 (All-Ireland semi-final, 16 August 1931)
Most points in a match: 12 
Kilkenny 1-6 : Cork 1-6 (All-Ireland final, 6 September 1931)
Kilkenny 3-4 : Cork 5-8 (All-Ireland final second replay, 1 November 1931)
Most goals by one team in a match: 8 
Kilkenny 8-8 : Wexford 1-1 (Leinster quarter-final, 31 May 1931)
Most goals scored by a losing team: 4 
Laois 4-2 : Kilkenny 4-7 (Leinster final, 2 August 1931)
Most points scored by a losing team: 6 
Clare 1-6 : Cork 3-4 (Munster quarter-final, 28 June 1931)

References

Sources

 Corry, Eoghan, The GAA Book of Lists (Hodder Headline Ireland, 2005).
 Donegan, Des, The Complete Handbook of Gaelic Games (DBA Publications Limited, 2005).

See also

1931
All-Ireland Senior Hurling Championship